Chazelle is a surname. Notable people with the surname include:

 Bernard Chazelle (born 1955), French computer scientist
 Celia Chazelle (born 1954), Canadian historian and author
 Damien Chazelle (born 1985), American screenwriter and film director

French-language surnames